The M19 expressway is a short east–west highway in Hungary. It connects the M1 motorway to city of Győr.

Junctions, exits and rest area

 The route is full length motorway, with half profile. The maximum speed limit is 90 km/h (2x1 lane road).

Maintenance
The operation and maintenance of the road by Hungarian Public Road Nonprofit Pte Ltd Co. This activity is provided by this highway engineer.
 near Komárom (M1), kilometre trench 85

Payment
Hungarian system has 2 main type in terms of salary:

1, time-based fee vignettes (E-matrica); with a validity of either 10 days (3500 HUF), 1 month (4780 HUF) or 1 year (42980 HUF).

2, county vignettes (Megyei matrica); the highway can be used instead of the national sticker with the following county stickers:

{| class="wikitable"
|- 
!Type of county vignette !! Available section
|-
|Győr-Moson-Sopron County
| full length (0 km – 10 km)
|-
|Komárom-Esztergom County
| between M1 motorway junction and Győrszentiván (0 km – 6 km)
|}

See also 

 Roads in Hungary
 Transport in Hungary

References

External links 

National Toll Payment Services Plc. (in Hungarian, some information also in English)
 Hungarian Public Road Non-Profit Ltd. (Magyar Közút Nonprofit Zrt.)
 National Infrastructure Developer Ltd.

19